Central Powerhouse, also known as the Town of Moriah Water Department Building, was a historic power station located at Witherbee in Essex County, New York, United States. It was built in 1902 and was a massive brick building with a steeply pitched gable roof. It consisted of a main block, four bays wide and seven bays long, with a two-stage, cast stone addition built in 1904–1905 as a transformer house and coal ash hopper. It was deeded to the Town of Moriah in 1962.

It was listed on the National Register of Historic Places in 1995. The building was demolished in 2001.

References

Industrial buildings and structures on the National Register of Historic Places in New York (state)
Energy infrastructure completed in 1902
Buildings and structures in Essex County, New York
Demolished buildings and structures in New York (state)
National Register of Historic Places in Essex County, New York
Buildings and structures demolished in 2001